Romuald Ardeois (born July 6, 1973 in Nantes) is a French professional football player. Currently, he plays in the Championnat de France amateur for SO Romorantin.

He played on the professional level in Ligue 1 and Ligue 2 for Angers SCO.

1973 births
Living people
French footballers
Ligue 1 players
Ligue 2 players
Angers SCO players
SO Romorantin players
Association football goalkeepers